Pastoral Composure is an album by American jazz pianist Matthew Shipp, recorded in 2000 and released on Thirsty Ear. It was the first installment of the Blue Series, a collection of releases curated by Shipp. He leads a quartet with trumpeter Roy Campbell, bassist William Parker and drummer Gerald Cleaver. The album includes a version of Duke Ellington composition "Prelude to a Kiss" and a rendition of the French traditional song "Frère Jacques".

Reception

In her review for AllMusic, Joslyn Layne states: "one of Shipp's more accessible albums, making it great place to start for those interested in checking out this important modern jazz pianist."
The Pitchfork review by Matt LeMay claims: "It's remarkably complex and musically proficient, yet instantly accessible, and a keeper in every respect."

Track listing
All compositions by Matthew Shipp except as indicated
 "Gesture" – 6:49
 "Visions" – 7:56
 "Prelude to a Kiss" (Duke Ellington) – 4:38 
 "Pastoral Composure" – 4:39 
 "Progression" – 5:33
 "Frère Jacques" (Traditional) – 5:36
 "Merge" – 5:46
 "Inner Order" – 3:44
 "XTU" – 3:34

Personnel
Matthew Shipp - piano
Roy Campbell - trumpet, pocket trumpet, flugelhorn
William Parker – bass
Gerald Cleaver – drums

References

2000 albums
Matthew Shipp albums
Thirsty Ear Recordings albums